Christ Church may refer to:

Churches in Australia

New South Wales
 Christ Church, Bong Bong
 Christ Church, Lavender Bay
 Christ Church, Queanbeyan
 Christ Church, Rouse Hill, Sydney
 Christ Church St Laurence, Sydney
 Christ Church Anglican Church, Bungonia
 Christ Church Anglican Church, Springwood
 Christ Church Cathedral, Grafton
 Christ Church Cathedral, Newcastle

Northern Territory
 Christ Church Cathedral, of the Anglican Diocese of the Northern Territory, Darwin

Queensland
 Christ Church, Childers
 Christ Church, Milton, Brisbane
 Christ Church Anglican Church, St Lawrence

South Australia
 Christ Church, North Adelaide

Victoria
 Christ Church, Geelong
 Christ Church, Hawthorn, Melbourne
 Christ Church, South Yarra, Melbourne

Churches in Canada
 Christ Chirch, Maugerville, a National Historic Site of Canada in New Brunswick
 Christ Church Royal Chapel, Deseronto, Ontario

Churches in India
 Christ Church (Shimla)
 Christ Church Anglo-Indian Higher Secondary School, Chennai
 Christ Church School, Mumbai
 CSI-Christ Church (Hyderabad)
Christ Church, Mhow

Churches in Ireland
 Christ Church, Bray
 Christ Church Cathedral, Dublin

Churches in Israel
 Christ Church, Jerusalem
 Christ Church, Nazareth

Churches in New Zealand
 Christ Church, Russell, the oldest extant church in New Zealand
 Christ Church, Taita, Lower Hutt

Churches in the United Kingdom

England
 Christ Church, Adlington, Lancashire
 Christ Church, Barnet
 Christ Church, Brixton Road, London
 Christ Church, Alsager, Cheshire
 Christ Church, Ashford, Kent
 Christ Church, Bacup, Lancashire
 Christ Church, Barnton, Cheshire
 Christ Church, Bath, Somerset
 Christ Church, Birkenhead, Merseyside
 Christ Church, Birmingham
 Christ Church, Blakenall Heath, Walsall, West Midlands
 Christ Church, Bradford-on-Avon, Wiltshire
 Christ Church, Bristol (also known as Christ Church with St Ewen)
 Christ Church, Chatburn, Lancashire
 Christ Church, Chester, Cheshire
 Christ Church, Clifton Down, Bristol
 Christ Church, Cockfosters, London
 Christ Church, Croft, Cheshire
 Christ Church, Crowton, Cheshire
 Christ Church, Dore, Dore, South Yorkshire
 Christ Church, East Sheen, London
 Christ Church, Eaton, Cheshire
 Christ Church, Ellesmere Port, Cheshire
 Christ Church, Fenton, Staffordshire
 Christ Church, Fairwarp, Maresfield, East Sussex
 Christ Church, Freemantle, Southampton
 Christ Church, Fulwood, Preston, Lancashire
 Christ Church, Fulwood, Sheffield
 Christ Church, Gipsy Hill, Lambeth, London
 Christ Church, Glasson, Lancashire
 Christ Church, Gleadless, Gleadless, Sheffield
 Christ Church Greyfriars, London (also known as Christ Church Newgate)
 Christ Church, Hackenthorpe, Sheffield
 Christ Church, Hampstead, London
 Christ Church, Hartlepool, County Durham (now Hartlepool Art Gallery)
 Christ Church, Hastings (disambiguation)
 Christ Church, Heaton Norris, Greater Manchester
 Christ Church, Higher Bebington, Merseyside
 Christ Church, Ince-in-Makerfield, Greater Manchester
 Christ Church, Kensington, Liverpool
 Christ Church, Kilndown, Kent
 Christ Church, Lambeth, London
 Christ Church, Lancaster, Lancashire
 Christ Church, Lichfield, Staffordshire
 Christ Church, Litton, Litton, Derbyshire
 Christ Church, Macclesfield, Cheshire
 Christ Church, Marylebone, Westminster 
 Christ Church, Moss Side, Manchester
 Christ Church, Nelson, Lancashire
 Christ Church, New Malden, London
 Christ Church, North Shields, Tyne and Wear
 Christ Church, Ore, Hastings, East Sussex
 Christ Church, Ottershaw, Surrey
 Christ Church, Over Wyresdale, Lancashire
 Christ Church, Pennington, Manchester
 Christ Church, Pitsmoor, Sheffield
 Christ Church, Port Sunlight, Merseyside
 Christ (Highfield) Church, Portswood, Southampton
 Christ Church, Reading, Berkshire
 Christ Church, St Leonards-on-Sea, East Sussex
 Christ Church, Sandown, Isle of Wight
 Christ Church, Shamley Green, Surrey
 Christ Church, Snodland, Kent
 Christ Church, Southwark, London
 Christ Church, Spitalfields, London
 Christ Church, Thornton, Lancashire
 Christ Church, Totland, Isle of Wight
 Christ Church, Toxteth Park, Liverpool
 Christ Church, Tunstall, Staffordshire
 Christ Church, Wadsley Bridge, Wadsley Bridge, Sheffield
 Christ Church, Walmsley, Bolton, Greater Manchester
 Christ Church, Ware, Hertfordshire
 Christ Church, Warminster, Wilts
 Christ Church, Wesham, Lancashire
 Christ Church, Weston Point, Runcorn, Cheshire
 Christ Church, Wharton, Winsford, Cheshire
 Christ Church, Wheelock, Cheshire
 Christ Church, Willaston, Cheshire
 Christ Church, Winchester, Hampshire
 Christ Church, Wolverhampton

Wales
 Christ Church, Bala, Gwynedd
 Christ Church, Bryn-y-Maen, Colwyn Bay, Denbighshire
 Christ Church, Rossett, Denbighshire

Isle of Man
 Christ Church, Laxey, one of Isle of Man's Registered Buildings

Churches in the United States

California
 Old North Church (Sierra Madre, California), now called Christ Church Sierra Madre, an historic landmark

Connecticut
 Christ Church (New Haven), listed on the NRHP

Delaware
 Christ Church, Broad Creek, Laurel
 Christ Church, Christiana Hundred, Greenville
 Christ Church, Delaware City
 Christ Church, Dover
 Christ Church, Milford, Delaware

Florida
 Christ Church (Episcopal), Fort Meade, Florida, listed on the NRHP
 Old Christ Church (Pensacola, Florida)

Georgia
 Christ Church (Macon, Georgia), listed on the NRHP
 Christ Church (Savannah, Georgia), a part of the Savannah Historic District
 Christ Church Anglican (Savannah, Georgia)
 Christ Church (St. Simons, Georgia)

Idaho
 Christ Church (Moscow, Idaho)

Iowa
 Christ Episcopal Church (Burlington, Iowa), listed on the NRHP

Maine
 Christ Church (Dark Harbor, Maine), listed on the NRHP

Maryland
 Christ Church (Accokeek, Maryland)
 Christ Episcopal Church and Cemetery (Cambridge, Maryland), listed on the NRHP
 Christ Church (Easton, Maryland)
 Christ Church Guilford, listed on the NRHP
 Christ Church (Ironsides, Maryland)
 Christ Church (Owensville, Maryland), listed on the NRHP
 Christ Church (Port Republic, Maryland), listed on the NRHP
 Christ Church (Stevensville, Maryland), listed on the NRHP

Massachusetts
 Old North Church, Boston (officially "Christ Church in the City of Boston"), a National Historic Landmark
 Christ Church, Hyde Park, Boston, listed on the NRHP
 Christ Church (Cambridge, Massachusetts), a National Historic Landmark
 Christ Church (Quincy, Massachusetts), listed on the NRHP
 Christ Episcopal Church (Waltham, Massachusetts), listed on the NRHP

Michigan
 Christ Church Cranbrook
 Christ Church Detroit
 Christ Church Chapel, Grosse Pointe

Minnesota
 Christ Church Lutheran (Minneapolis, Minnesota), a National Historic Landmark

Mississippi
 Christ Church (Church Hill, Mississippi), listed on the NRHP in Mississippi
 Christ Church (Vicksburg, Mississippi), a landmark in Warren County, Mississippi

New Hampshire
 Christ Church, Exeter, New Hampshire

New Jersey
 Christ Church (Middletown, New Jersey), listed on the NRHP
 Christ Church, New Brunswick, New Jersey, listed on the NRHP
 Christ Church, Newton, listed on the NRHP
 Christ Church (Episcopal), Shrewsbury, listed on the NRHP
 Christ Church USA, Montclair & Rockaway

New York
 Christ Church (Binghamton, New York), listed on the NRHP in Broome County
 Christ Church (Greenville, Greene County, New York), listed on the NRHP for Greene County
 Christ Church (Middletown, New York), listed on the NRHP in Orange County
 Christ Church (Oyster Bay, New York)
 Christ Church (Rochester, New York), listed on the NRHP in Monroe County
 Christ Church (Sparkill, New York), listed on the NRHP in Rockland County
 Christ Episcopal Church (Tarrytown, New York), listed on the NRHP in Westchester County
 Christ Church Lutheran (New York City)
 Old Christ Church Lutheran (New York City)
 Christ Church United Methodist, Manhattan, New York City
 Christ Church (Bronx), listed on the NRHP in Bronx County

North Carolina
 Christ Episcopal Church and Parish House (New Bern, North Carolina), listed on the NRHP
 Christ Episcopal Church (Raleigh, North Carolina), listed on the NRHP in North Carolina

Pennsylvania
 Christ Church, Philadelphia, a National Historic Landmark

South Carolina
 Christ Church (Greenville, South Carolina), listed on the NRHP
 Christ Church (Mount Pleasant, South Carolina), listed on the NRHP

Tennessee
 Christ Church (Nashville, Tennessee), listed on the NRHP in Tennessee

Texas
 Christ Church (Houston, Texas), listed on the NRHP in Texas

Vermont
 Christ Church (Guilford, Vermont), listed on the NRHP

Virginia
 Christ Church (Alexandria, Virginia), a National Historic Landmark
 Christ Church (Lancaster County, Virginia), a National Historic Landmark
 Christ Church (Norfolk, Virginia), listed on the NRHP in Virginia
 Christ Church (Saluda, Virginia), listed on the NRHP in Virginia

Washington, D.C.
 Christ Church (Georgetown, Washington, D.C.), listed on the NRHP
 Christ Church, Washington Parish, listed on the NRHP

Churches elsewhere
 Christ Church, Vienna, Austria
 Christ Church Parish Church, Barbados
 Christ Church, Copenhagen, Denmark
 Christ Church, Lille, France
 German Speaking Evangelical Congregation in Iran or Christ Church in Tehran, Iran
 Christ Church, Yokohama, Japan
 Christuskirche (Mainz), Germany
 Christ Church (Melaka), Malaysia
 Christ Church, Windhoek, Namibia
 Christ Church Rawalpindi, Pakistan
 Christ Church, Galkissa, Sri Lanka
 Christ Church, Zanzibar, Tanzania
 Christ Church Bangkok, Thailand
 Christ Church, Bergen, Norway

Educational institutions
 Christ Church, Oxford, a constituent college of the University of Oxford, U.K., and the associated cathedral
 Canterbury Christ Church University, Kent, England
 Christ Church Grammar School, Perth, Western Australia
 Christ Church Secondary School, Singapore
 Christ Church Episcopal School, Greenville, South Carolina, U.S.
 Christ Church College (disambiguation)
 Christ Church Primary School, a primary school of Wolverhampton, England

Other uses
 "Christ Church" (song), by The Dubliners
 Christ Church, Barbados, a civil parish
 Christ Church Nichola Town Parish, a civil parish in the West Indies

See also
 Christ Cathedral (disambiguation)
 Christ Church, Cambridge (disambiguation)
 Christ Church Cathedral (disambiguation)
 Christ Episcopal Church (disambiguation)
 Christchurch (disambiguation)
 Christian Church (disambiguation)
 Christ's Church (disambiguation)
 Christuskirche (disambiguation)
 Church of Christ (disambiguation)